Vain, Erudite and Stupid: Selected Works 1987–2005 is a compilation album by New Zealand noise rock band The Dead C, released on 1 August 2006 through Ba Da Bing Records.

Track listing

Personnel 
Rob Carmichael – design
The Dead C – production, recording
Michael Morley – instruments
Bruce Russell – instruments
Robbie Yeats – instruments

References

2006 compilation albums
The Dead C albums
Ba Da Bing Records albums